Krstović is a Serbian surname. It may refer to:

Radovan Krstović (born 1963), retired Serbian footballer
Bojan Krstović (born 1980), Serbian basketballer

See also
Krstić, surname
Krstovići, settlement in Zadar, Croatia

Serbian surnames